Maleján is a municipality located in the province of Zaragoza, Aragon, Spain. According to the 2010 census (INE), the municipality has a population of 344 inhabitants.

See also
Campo de Borja

References

External links
Ayuntamiento de Maleján

Municipalities in the Province of Zaragoza